Tukuma is a 1984 Danish drama film directed by Palle Kjærulff-Schmidt. The film was selected as the Danish entry for the Best Foreign Language Film at the 57th Academy Awards, but was not accepted as a nominee.

Cast
 Thomas Eje as Erik
 Naja Rosing Olsen as Sørine
 Rasmus Lyberth as Rasmus
 Benedikte Schmidt as Elizabeth
 Rasmus Thygesen as Otto

See also
 List of submissions to the 57th Academy Awards for Best Foreign Language Film
 List of Danish submissions for the Academy Award for Best Foreign Language Film

References

External links
 

1984 films
1984 drama films
Danish drama films
1980s Danish-language films
Films directed by Palle Kjærulff-Schmidt